Plinthograptis clyster is a species of moth of the family Tortricidae. It is found in Nigeria.

The wingspan is about 9 mm. The ground colour of the forewings is leaden grey with a broad orange-yellow costal fascia which is dotted with black. There is a red pattern consisting of a basal group of three oblique markings, a median group consisting of a row of four spots and a similar median row. The apex is finely black edged. The hindwings are dark grey.

References

Endemic fauna of Nigeria
Moths described in 1990
Tortricini
Moths of Africa
Taxa named by Józef Razowski